Giovanni Vincenzo Zerbi was a 17th-century Italian painter of the Baroque period, who was mainly active in Genoa as a portrait artist. He was a disciple of the Genoese painter Domenico Fiasella. He also painted under the name Vincenzio Zerbi.

Sources

17th-century Italian painters
Italian male painters
Painters from Genoa
Italian Baroque painters
Year of death unknown
Year of birth unknown